A dysgerminoma is a type of germ cell tumor; it usually is malignant and usually occurs in the ovary.

A tumor of the identical histology but not occurring in the ovary may be described by an alternate name:  seminoma in the testis or germinoma in the central nervous system or other parts of the body.

Dysgerminoma accounts for less than 1% of ovarian tumors overall. Dysgerminoma usually occurs in adolescence and early adult life; about 5% occur in pre-pubertal children. Dysgerminoma is extremely rare after age 50.  Dysgerminoma occurs in both ovaries in 10% of patients and, in a further 10%, there is microscopic tumor in the other ovary.

Abnormal gonads (due to gonadal dysgenesis and androgen insensitivity syndrome) have a high risk of developing a dysgerminoma. Most dysgerminomas are associated with elevated serum lactic dehydrogenase (LDH), which is sometimes used as a tumor marker.

Signs and symptoms

They are exceptionally associated with hypercalcemia. On gross examination, dysgerminomas present with a smooth, bosselated (knobby) external surface, and is soft, fleshy and either cream-coloured, gray, pink or tan when cut. Microscopic examination typically reveals uniform cells that resemble primordial germ cells.  Typically, the stroma contains lymphocytes and about 20% of patients have sarcoid-like granulomas.
Metastases are most often present in the lymph nodes.

Diagnosis
LDH tumour markers is elevated in 95% of the cases.

Treatment
Dysgerminomas, like other seminomatous germ cell tumors, are very sensitive to both chemotherapy and radiotherapy.  For this reason, with treatment patients' chances of long-term survival, even cure, is excellent. Targeted treatments for dysgerminomas that do not respond to chemotherapy are being evaluated.

References

External links 

Gynaecological neoplasia
Germ cell neoplasia